Boubacar Séré (born 13 May 1984) is a Burkinabé athlete competing in the high jump.

His personal best in the event is 2.22 metres. This is the current national record.

Competition record

References

1984 births
Living people
Burkinabé male high jumpers
Athletes (track and field) at the 2007 All-Africa Games
African Games competitors for Burkina Faso
Islamic Solidarity Games medalists in athletics
21st-century Burkinabé people